Sami Juhani Savio (born 23 September 1975 in Mäntyharju) is a Finnish politician currently serving in the Parliament of Finland for the Finns Party at the Pirkanmaa constituency.

References

1975 births
Living people
People from Mäntyharju
Finns Party politicians
Members of the Parliament of Finland (2015–19)
Members of the Parliament of Finland (2019–23)